Black & Black is an album by the American musician David Murray, released in 1991. It features performances by Murray, Marcus Belgrave, Kirk Lightsey, Santi Debriano and Roy Haynes. The album was produced by Bob Thiele.

Reception
The AllMusic review by Scott Yanow stated: "Not essential but worth picking up by David Murray fans."

Track listing
 "Anti-Calypso" (Prince) - 10:08 
 "Duke's Place" (Ellington, Thiele, Roberts, Bill Katz) - 11:05 
 "Cool" (Osser, Thiele) - 11:21 
 "Black and Black" (Osser, Thiele) - 10:48 
 "Head Out" (Murray) - 12:44

Personnel
David Murray - tenor saxophone
Marcus Belgrave - trumpet
Kirk Lightsey - piano
Santi Debriano - bass
Roy Haynes - drums

References 

David Murray (saxophonist) albums
1991 albums
Red Baron Records albums